MGF may stand for:

 MG F, a 1995 mid-engined, rear wheel drive roadster manufactured by the Rover Group  
 Machine Gun Fellatio, an Australian alternative band
 Magnesium fluoride (chemical formula MgF2)
 Malagasy franc, the former currency of Madagascar in ISO 4217 code
 Mechano growth factor, a peptide hormone produced in muscles in response to training, considered an isoform of IGF-1
 Moment-generating function, in probability and statistics
 .mgf, (for Mascot generic format) a data file format used by Mascot mass spectrometry software
 Mask generation function, a function generating an arbitrary number of bits for a given input (for example MGF1 from PKCS 1)